The Piper House is a historic home located at the southeast corner of Main and Church Streets in Sharpsburg, Washington County, Maryland, United States. It has a two-story limestone main block, constructed between 1792 and 1804, with a two-story brick wing, added about 1834.  The house features a hip-roofed porch that shelters the main central entrance.

The Piper House was listed on the National Register of Historic Places in 1999.

References

External links
, including photo from 1999, at Maryland Historical Trust

Houses on the National Register of Historic Places in Maryland
Houses in Washington County, Maryland
Sharpsburg, Maryland
National Register of Historic Places in Washington County, Maryland